Club Deportivo Saski-Baskonia, S.A.D., commonly known as Saski Baskonia, also known as Cazoo Baskonia for sponsorship reasons, is a professional basketball team that is based in Vitoria-Gasteiz, Spain. The team plays in the Liga ACB and the EuroLeague.

History

1959–1969: start in the provincial basketball 
In 1951, the Club Deportivo Vasconia organized its own basketball section but without enough support to survive in the competition. It was already in the 1959–60 season when the club founded the basketball section after disappointment with the football team, under the presidency of Félix Ullivarriarrazua. Vicente Elejalde was appointed as head coach.

In its first season, the team occupied the second position of the provincial championship behind Corazonistas. In the 1963–64 season, the team achieved its first provincial titles, proclaiming itself champion of league and cup. The team became strong in the provincial championship winning five of the ten editions played between 1959 and 1969. The club achieved the promotion to the 3rd division after beating the city rival Deportivo Alavés in the season that Vicente Elejalde was replaced by Pepe Laso.

1970–1980: the leap to the Spanish top league 
In 1969–70 season, the team was promoted in the 3rd division with a very young team. The team achieved the promotion to the 2nd division after beating Grupo Covadonga in the promotion playoffs. In the next season, the team made a great regular season which qualified for the promotion playoffs to the 1st division, but was defeated by Breogán in the promotion playoffs. A year later, the team achieved promotion to the 1st division after finishing as the champion of the Group A.

The team achieved its first win in its first game in its first season in the 1st division by 89–67 against Breogán. This season, the Basque team became strong at home by winning direct rivals avoiding the relegation six rounds before to finish the league by winning in Bilbao and debuted in the Copa del Rey reaching the semi-finals where were eliminated by Estudiantes. In the 1973–74 season, the club reached 1,400 supporters and this support allowed to sign its first foreign player, the Canadian Phil Tollestrup. This second season, the team concluded the league in eighth position and it gain the right to play in Korać Cup, but it had to resign due to lack of budget.

In 1974, Jose Luis Sánchez Erauskin, former player and founder of the club, took over the club's presidency. The team incorporated young players such as Manu Moreno, Kepa Segurola, Luis María Junguitu, Carlos Salinas and José Antonio Querejeta. The signing star was the American Ray Price who became in the top scorer of the competition. In the 1975–76 season, the humble team starred in two surprising wins, managed to impose 70–69 to FC Barcelona in home game and Joventut in a road game 76–78. In Badalona, the Joventut fans ended up cheering the great match. In the 1976–77 season, the president José Luis Sánchez Erauskin along with his board, made the decision to change the V by B, in the name of the club, becoming Club Deportivo Basconia and adopting the colors of the Ikurriña as the headlines. The equipment became green with red and white letters, instead of the usual blue and maroon. Pepe Laso combined his position as head coach with the Spanish coach and Iñaki Garaialde and Txema Capetillo joined the team.

In 1977, Juan Antonio Ortiz de Pinedo retired as a player to become the head coach of the team, replacing Pepe Laso. In 1978, José Antonio Querejeta, who had negotiated with other teams like Joventut and FC Barcelona, was transferred to Real Madrid. The club, in addition to financial compensation, obtained the young player Manuel San Emeterio from the white club. Iñaki Iriarte became the head coach of the team and the American who signed with the team this year was Webb Williams. Players like Junguitu, Txomin Sautu returned and Juan Manuel Conde was signed. Fernando Aranguiz assumed the presidency of the club in June 1978 and Carlos Luquero received the tribute to his entire career, he was the first to have a professional record accumulating more than 300 games and adding more than 7,000 points with the team. In the Copa del Rey, the team returned to reach the semi-finals after defeating Mollet and Estudiantes in the previous rounds, but cannot defeat the winner of that year FC Barcelona.

In 1979, Peio Cambronero arrived from Estudiantes, and the club again with a tight budget, young players and the signing of the American Malcolm Cesare faced the 1979–80 season with the aim of maintaining the category for another year. The results were not good and the team finished the league in relegation positions. Fortunately, the Spanish Federation decided to extend the competition to fourteen teams and the team could continue one more year in the league.

1980–1990: in steady progression 
The 1980–81 season was one of the saddest memories for the club, because it relegated to the 2nd division after finished in last position of the league with a baggage of six wins, two achieved against renowned teams like Real Madrid and Joventut. But the misfortunes did not end there, since one of his players Juanma Conde died after an irreversible illness. This was a blow to the entire club, for the loss of a teammate and a friend.

In the summer of 1981, José Antonio Querejeta, who had returned to the team after passing through Real Madrid and had been tested by FC Barcelona, was transferred to Joventut. With the direction of Iñaki Iriarte from the bench and the contribution of the Cambronero Peio, Txomin Sautu, Salva Diez, Mikel Cuadra, Xabier Jon Davalillo and Luis Mari Junguitu allowed the team to promote to the 1st division and return to the place that it had occupied among the greats teams for almost a decade. A new change in the presidency of the club allowed the arrival of José Antonio Apraiz. The season of the return to the top league was not very positive in terms of results, the team ended up in relegation positions with a baggage of three wins, three draws and twenty defeats. The Spanish basketball was preparing to enter a new stage marked by professionalism, and the creation of the Liga ACB made it possible for the team to avoid relegation back to 2nd Division.

As of the 1983–84 season with the first edition of the Liga ACB, the modern Spanish basketball story begins in which the club was strongly committed to leaving its modest club status. Basque guard Alberto Ortega returns to the team, one of the stars of the league like Essie Hollis and Rilley Clarida became the first couple of foreigners of the club because the new Liga ACB allowed the signing of two foreign players per team. In the 1984–85 season, José Antonio Querejeta returned to the team, Pablo Laso made the leap to the first team after his trip at an American institute with only 16 years, which together with another youth player like Aitor Zárate formed the youngest guards in the league. As a counterpoint to this commitment to youth, an illustrious veteran of Spanish basketball like Miguel López signed for the team. Completing the incorporations with the arrival of Terry White as new foreign player for the team led by Xabier Añua.

In 1985, the club won its first official title, the Copa Asociación which was played among the teams eliminated in the first round of the league playoffs. In the final, the team won to the Zaragoza led by Pepe Laso in Villanueva de La Serena (Badajoz). José Antonio Querejeta was the top scorer of the game with 30 points and the team earned the qualification to the Korać Cup for the following season. At the institutional level, Jose Antonio Santamaría is again the club president. The 1985–86 season was marked by the Korać Cup debut. The first rival was the Dutch Super Cracks Werkendam, which was clearly defeated at home (73–88) and overwhelmingly in Vitoria-Gasteiz (130–94). The next rival was the French ASVEL. In the home game, the Basque team fell against the French team 84–94, but this defeat did not undermine the team hopes to seek the comeback weeks later in Lyon. The game played in the French town at the end of game resulted in a draw at 88 points, but the competition system computed the difference in points of both clashes and meant the elimination of the Basque team from the competition.

At that time, important foreigners such as Abdul Jeelani and Larry Micheaux arrived who gave a plus of quality to a large team from the team (Alberto Ortega, José Antonio Querejeta, Pablo Laso, Jesús Brizuela and the young players Madoz, Urdiain, Felix De La Fuente and Arana) and directed by Pepe Laso who returned to be the head coach of the team for two seasons. A season later, the captain of the team, Iñaki Garaialde, who was honored in Polideportivo Mendizorrotza days before the start of the 1987–88 season, retired as a player. Manu Moreno took over the bench as the head coach. Names like Fede Ramiro, or Agustin Cuesta with an already important experience in Spanish basketball reinforced the team. Larry Micheaux and David Lawrence formed the American couple, but the weak performance of the second led to its replacement by the jumpy Nikita Wilson midway through the season. The team was strong at home and began to stand up to rivals with a bigger budget. The season ended in eighth position.

At the start of the 1988–89 season, José Antonio Querejeta retired as a player. A few weeks after his retirement, offered himself as a candidate for the presidency of the club and José Antonio Santamaría gave his position to the former player, being one of the youngest presidents of the ACB. As president, began the process of converting the club into a Sociedad Anónima Deportiva, as required by the Sports Law. The club became the first Spanish professional sport club to carry out this transformation and was born under the name of Saski-Baskonia S.A.D.. The Baskonia of José Antonio Querejeta wanted to take another step in the professionalization of the club taking as an example the NBA franchises and began to make his first important bets, the signing of Chicho Sibilio after being one of the stars of FC Barcelona. Puerto Rican pivot from the Boston Celtics, Ramón Rivas and the signing of the Argentine Marcelo Nicola who signed a 10-year deal as a franchise player in which the club would settle in the 90s.

The objective was to overcome the seventh place in the final standings that would allow the pass to compete in European competitions. Despite these important bets, the 1989–90 season the club failed to take that step forward. Halfway through the season, Manu Moreno was sacked as coach and the Željko Pavličević signed after a brilliant record in Cibona. However, the team fell in the first round of playoffs against Real Madrid and closed his short stay in Vitoria-Gasteiz as a head coach.

1990–2010: introducing in European basketball and first trophies 
With José Antonio Querejeta as president, the club grows exponentially. Herb Brown signed as head coach and Alfredo Salazar began his travels through Argentina to capture talent. In 1991, the club left Polideportivo Mendizorrotza to move to the Araba Arena, which lived its extension from 5,000 to 9,500 spectators at the end of the decade. In 1993, Manel Comas signed as head coach. With Manel Comas, the team won its first Spanish King's Cup, when Pablo Laso and Velimir Perasović led the team to an historical win. The club was already making noise internationally too, reaching the FIBA European Cup final in both 1994 and 1995. When it hosted the same title game in 1996, the team pleased its many fans by downing PAOK behind 31 points from Ramón Rivas. After the departure of Manel Comas, Sergio Scariolo signed as head coach. With Scariolo, the team made its first Spanish Championship playoff final in 1998 and added a second Spanish King's Cup title in 1999. Names like Ramón Rivas, Marcelo Nicola, Juan Alberto Espil, Pablo Laso, Elmer Bennett or Velimir Perasović were some of the protagonists of that decade.

The team started the 21st century with Duško Ivanović on the bench. In his first year, they then found quick success in the newly reborn EuroLeague. With a deep roster featuring Elmer Bennett, Saulius Štombergas, Victor Alexander, Fabricio Oberto and a young Luis Scola, Baskonia reached the 2001 Euroleague Finals, before losing to Virtus Bologna in the fifth and final game on the road. With winning momentum and the additions of Dejan Tomašević and Andrés Nocioni, the team achieved its first double in the next season, with another Spanish King's Cup trophy and its first Spanish League title ever. Baskonia snatched two more Spanish King's Cups, in 2004 and 2006, as Luis Scola and Pablo Prigioni played decisive roles, and success followed the team in the EuroLeague. Baskonia's arrival to its first EuroLeague Final Four in 2005 couldn't have been louder, as the team upset favored host CSKA Moscow in the semi-finals, but couldn't overcome defending champ Maccabi in the title game.

Back home, Baskonia again reached the Spanish League finals, only to lose in dramatic fashion. Baskonia returned to the EuroLeague Final Four in 2006, but once again Maccabi stood in its way, this time in the semi-final. The team also made it to the Spanish League finals, but was swept there. The next season, Baskonia won its EuroLeague regular season and Top 16 groups before sweeping Olympiacos in the Playoffs, as Scola became the Euroleague Basketball's top all-time scorer at that time. Nonetheless, eventual champion Panathinaikos downed Baskonia in the semi-finals and once home again in Spain, Baskonia lost in the semi-finals.

Through outstanding scouting and shrewd management, Baskonia built a squad that went to four straight EuroLeague Final Fours. Baskonia advanced to the EuroLeague Final Four in 2005, 2006, 2007, and 2008, losing to Maccabi Tel Aviv in the 2005 final, and 2006 semi-finals, to Panathinaikos in the 2007 semi-finals, and to CSKA Moscow in the 2008 semi-finals.

In the 2007–08 season, the team led by Neven Spahija won its second Spanish Liga ACB championship. In 2008–09 season, the team added its sixth Spanish King's Cup title. In the 2009–10 season, Baskonia won its third Spanish Liga ACB championship by sweeping FC Barcelona on a memorable series-winning three-point play by Fernando San Emeterio. Names like Luis Scola, Andrés Nocioni, Pablo Prigioni. Igor Rakočević, Arvydas Macijauskas, José Calderón, Pete Mickeal or Tiago Splitter were some of the protagonists of that decade.

2010–present: new arena and the new EuroLeague era 

In 2012, its arena Fernando Buesa Arena was expanded to 15,504 seats and the many initiatives the club continues to put into practice show that Baskonia is always moving forward. The club reached the EuroLeague Playoffs in 2011 and 2012 and reached the Top 16 14 times in 15 years. In 2016, Baskonia returned the EuroLeague Final Four for the first time in eight years, as the club made it to the 2016 Final Four. Here the team was defeated after overtime in the semi-final by Fenerbahçe. In the third place game, Baskonia lost to Russian side Lokomotiv Kuban.

In the 2016–17 season, the EuroLeague adopted a new league-style format in which a round-robin season of sixteen teams was played. In the first season in the new format, the team changed its core of players and also its head coach, but still remained deep in the playoff zone for most of the regular season and ended up advancing to the next phase with a 17–13 record and seventh place. A four-game winning streak in December and another in March covered up for a negative run of six losses in seven games between Rounds 17 and 23. Baskonia clinched a playoff berth for the 10th time in 12 seasons, but there the team was swept by CSKA Moscow after three tough games. Ádám Hanga was one of the team leaders and was chosen as the EuroLeague Best Defender by the league's head coaches, and Baskonia showed, once again, its innate ability to sign talent that seemed to go under the radar for everybody else with names like Shane Larkin, Johannes Voigtmann and Rodrigue Beaubois playing major roles.

In the 2017–18 season, the club advanced to the playoffs for the third consecutive year and put up a major fight against Fenerbahçe before falling in four games. None of that was looking likely when the Basque club suffered a shocking start, losing its first four games to signal the departure from the coaching position of club legend Pablo Prigioni. The man appointed to turn things around was Pedro Martínez, who immediately effected a remarkable revival as Baskonia won four of its next five games to ignite its challenge. A mid-season dip left the side in the bottom half of the standings heading into the final few weeks of the regular season, but then came a dramatic surge in form that yielded six consecutive win, with the consistent excellence of versatile big man Tornike Shengelia earning him the monthly MVP award for March. A top half finish was sealed with a home win over Maccabi Tel Aviv in Round 29, and although disappointment followed against Fenerbahçe, that playoff berth was a just reward for Baskonia's typically spirited recovery from its slow start. The team was also highly competitive on the domestic front, earning a second-place finish in the Spanish League after pushing Real Madrid hard in the finals.

The 2018–19 season was an important season for the club with the Final Four taking place on its home court. A slow start caused Baskonia to part ways with head coach Pedro Martínez and bring back club legend Velimir Perasović to replace him. Baskonia kept struggling on the road, but won 10 of its last 11 regular season games – including victories against playoff-bound teams CSKA Moscow, Panathinaikos and Real Madrid – to reach the playoffs from sixth place. Baskonia managed to do something no team had done in over a decade – steal home-court advantage in a playoff series against CSKA, but the Russian powerhouse recovered with back-to-back wins at Buesa Arena to qualify for the Final Four and eventually win the title. Vincent Poirier was chosen to the All-EuroLeague Second Team. Baskonia had early exits in its two main domestic competitions; it lost against Joventut in the Copa del Rey quarterfinals and against Zaragoza in the Spanish League quarterfinals.

On 30 June 2020, ten years after their last title, Baskonia won the 2019–20 ACB season, marked by the COVID-19 pandemic.

Sponsorship naming 
The club was often referred to for years as TAU Cerámica, a Spanish brand name of ceramics manufacturer TAULELL, which name sponsored the club from 1987 to 2009. Originally, TAULELL used another of its brand names, Taugrés, as the name of the team, before changing the name to TAU Cerámica in 1997. TAU, Taugrés and TAU Vitoria were also frequently used to refer to the team. Baskonia, Saski Baskonia, and Saski Baskonia, S.A.D. refer to the name of the actual sports club itself. In 2009, the Spanish credit union Caja Laboral became the new name sponsor of the club and increased the amount of money that the name sponsor contributes to the sports club's budget. In 2016, Laboral Kutxa end its sponsorship naming to Baskonia.

Baskonia has received diverse sponsorship names along the years:

 Caja Álava (1983–1987)
 Taugrés (1987–1997) / Tau Cerámica (1997–2009)
 Caja Laboral / Laboral Kutxa (2009–2016)
 Kirolbet Baskonia (2018–2020)
 TD Systems Baskonia (2020–2021)
 Bitci Baskonia (2021–2022)
 Cazoo Baskonia (2022–present)

Arena 

Since 1991, Baskonia has played its home games at the Fernando Buesa Arena, which has a seating capacity of 15,504 people for basketball games. The arena was originally called the Pabellón Araba, from 1991 to 2000. The arena was extensively renovated and expanded in the year 2012.

The arena hosted the 1996 FIBA European Cup Final, in which Baskonia won the title and also hosted the 2010 Eurocup Finals, before hosting the EuroLeague Final Four in 2019.

Players

Current roster

Depth chart

Notable players 
Despite not having retired any number in its history, three of the club's most notable players have a shirt with the number they wore in their time with the team hung in the Fernando Buesa Arena. These are Pablo Prigioni (#5), whose shirt was put on display in 2017; Igor Rakočević (#8) and Sergi Vidal (#9), who followed suit in 2020.

 Carlos Cabezas
 José Calderón
 Carlos Cazorla
 Ilimane Diop
 Jorge Garbajosa
 Roberto Íñiguez
 Pablo Laso
 Fernando San Emeterio
 Pau Ribas
 Sergi Vidal
 Walter Herrmann
 Marcelo Nicola
 Andrés Nocioni
 Fabricio Oberto
 Pablo Prigioni
 Luis Scola
 Luca Vildoza
 Mirza Teletović
 Marcelo Huertas
 Tiago Splitter
 Georgi Glouchkov
 Velimir Perasović
 Zoran Planinić
 Darko Planinić
 Roko Ukić
 Jim Bilba
 Laurent Foirest
 Thomas Heurtel
 William Phillips
 Kevin Séraphin
 Hanno Möttölä
 Tornike Shengelia
 Tibor Pleiß
 Johannes Voigtmann
 Ioannis Bourousis
 Christos Charissis
 Kornél Dávid
 Ádám Hanga
 Pat Burke
 Lior Eliyahu
 Andrea Bargnani
 Simone Fontecchio
 Achille Polonara
 Stefano Rusconi
 Dāvis Bertāns
 Jānis Timma
 Simas Jasaitis
 Rimantas Kaukėnas
 Arvydas Macijauskas
 Saulius Štombergas
 Mindaugas Timinskas
 Predrag Drobnjak
 Thomas Kelati
 Maciej Lampe
 David Logan
 Ramón Rivas
 Miroslav Berić
 Nemanja Bjelica
 Vladimir Micov
 Dejan Tomašević
 Igor Rakočević
 Richard Petruška
 Goran Dragić
 Zoran Dragić
 Jaka Blažič
 Ender Arslan
 Serkan Erdoğan
 Kaya Peker
 Andrew Betts
 Victor Alexander
 Jerome Allen
 J. J. Anderson
 Joe Arlauckas
 Wade Baldwin IV
 Ken Bannister
 Scooter Barry
 Elmer Bennett
 Anthony Bonner
 Ryan Bowen
 Rickey Brown
 Lionel Chalmers
 Chris Corchiani
 Pat Durham
 Rashard Griffith
 Travis Hansen
 Pierriá Henry
 Darrun Hilliard
 Essie Hollis
 Casey Jacobsen
 Mike James
 Linton Johnson
 Jalen Jones 
 Randolph Keys
 Shane Larkin
 Will McDonald
 Jordan McRae 
 Larry Micheaux
 Pete Mickeal
 Drew Nicholas
 Dan O'Sullivan
 Lamar Odom
 Lou Roe
 Brent Scott
 James Singleton
 Matt Steigenga
 Nikita Wilson
 David Wood

Players at the NBA Draft

Head coaches 

  Vicente Elejalde 1959–1969
  Pepe Laso 1969–1977, 1985–1987
  Juan Antonio Ortiz de Pinedo 1977–1978, 1982–1983
  Iñaki Iriarte 1978–1980, 1981–1983, 1992–1993
  Manu Moreno 1980–1981, 1987–1989
  Txema Capetillo 1983–1984
  Xabier Añúa 1984–1985
  Željko Pavličević 1989–1990
  Herb Brown 1990–1992
  Manel Comas 1993–1997
  Sergio Scariolo 1997–1999, 2013–2014
  Salva Maldonado 1999
  Julio Lamas 1999–2000
  Duško Ivanović 2000–2005, 2008–2012, 2019–2021
  Pedro Martínez 2005, 2017–2018
  Velimir Perasović 2005–2007, 2015–2016, 2018–2019
  Natxo Lezkano 2007
  Božidar Maljković 2007
  Neven Spahija 2007–2008, 2021–2022
  Žan Tabak 2012–2013
  Marco Crespi 2014
  Ibon Navarro 2014–2015
  Sito Alonso 2016–2017
  Pablo Prigioni 2017
  Joan Peñarroya 2022–present

Source: baskonistas.com

Logos

Season by season

Honours

Domestic competitions 
 Spanish League
 Winners (4): 2001–02, 2007–08, 2009–10, 2019–20
 Runners-up (5): 1997–98, 2004–05, 2005–06, 2008–09, 2017–18
 Spanish Cup
 Winners (6): 1995, 1999, 2002, 2004, 2006, 2009
 Runners-up (3): 1994, 2003, 2008
 Spanish Supercup
 Winners (4): 2005, 2006, 2007, 2008.
 Runners-up (2): 2011, 2018
 Association Cup
 Winners (1): 1985
 2nd Division
 Winners (1): 1971–72
 Basque Cup
 Winners (4): 2010–11, 2011–12, 2018–19, 2022–23

European competitions 
 EuroLeague
 Runners-up (2): 2000–01, 2004–05
 3rd place (1): 2005–06
 4th place (3): 2006–07, 2007–08, 2015–16
 Final Four (5): 2005, 2006, 2007, 2008, 2016
 FIBA Saporta Cup
 Winners (1): 1995–96 MVP Ramón Rivas
 Runners-up (2): 1993–94, 1994–95

Other competitions 
 Trofeo Diputación / Álava
 Winners (27): 1991, 1992, 1995, 1996, 1997, 1999, 2000, 2001, 2002, 2003, 2004, 2005, 2006, 2007, 2008, 2009, 2010, 2011, 2012, 2013, 2014, 2016, 2017, 2018, 2019, 2021, 2022
 Estella, Spain Invitational Game
 Winners (1): 2007
 Logroño, Spain Invitational Game
 Winners (1): 2007
 Ourense, Spain Invitational Game
 Winners (1): 2008
 Tudela, Spain Invitational Game
 Winners (1): 2008
 Torneo de Lleida Stagepro
 3rd Place (1): 2009
 Switzerland Invitational Game
 Winners (1): 2010
 Torneo Angers
 Winners (1): 2010
 Lanzarote, Spain Invitational Game
 Winners (1): 2011
 Bergara, Spain Invitational Game
 Winners (1): 2015
 Torneo Fundacion CID
 Runners-up (1): 2016

Individual awards 

ACB Most Valuable Player
Kenny Green – 1997
Andrés Nocioni – 2004
Luis Scola – 2005, 2007
Tiago Splitter – 2010
Fernando San Emeterio – 2011
Ioannis Bourousis – 2016

ACB Rising Star
Mirza Teletović – 2008

ACB Finals MVP
Elmer Bennett – 2002
Pete Mickeal – 2008
Tiago Splitter – 2010
Luca Vildoza – 2020

Spanish Cup MVP
Joe Arlauckas – 1993
Velimir Perasović – 1994
Pablo Laso – 1995
Elmer Bennett – 1999
Dejan Tomašević – 2002
Pablo Prigioni – 2007
Mirza Teletović – 2009

Supercup MVP
Luis Scola – 2005
Tiago Splitter – 2006, 2007
Pablo Prigioni – 2008

ACB Three Point Shootout Champion
Juan Alberto Espil – 1997
Igor Rakočević – 2007

EuroLeague Best Defender
Ádám Hanga – 2017

All-EuroLeague First Team
Dejan Tomašević – 2002
Arvydas Macijauskas – 2005
Luis Scola – 2006, 2007
Tiago Splitter – 2008
Igor Rakočević – 2009
Fernando San Emeterio – 2011
Ioannis Bourousis – 2016
Tornike Shengelia – 2018

All-EuroLeague Second Team
Andrés Nocioni – 2003, 2004
Luis Scola – 2005
Pablo Prigioni – 2006, 2007
Igor Rakočević – 2007
Tiago Splitter – 2009, 2010
Vincent Poirier – 2019

All-ACB First Team
Andrés Nocioni – 2004, 2013
Luis Scola – 2004, 2005, 2006, 2007
José Calderón – 2005
Pablo Prigioni – 2006, 2007, 2009
Igor Rakočević – 2009
Tiago Splitter – 2010
Marcelo Huertas – 2011
Fernando San Emeterio – 2011
Mirza Teletović – 2012
Darius Adams – 2016
Ioannis Bourousis – 2016
Ádám Hanga – 2017
Tornike Shengelia – 2018
Pierriá Henry – 2021

All-ACB Second Team
Ádám Hanga – 2016
Shane Larkin – 2017
Tornike Shengelia – 2019, 2020
Vincent Poirier – 2019
Rokas Giedraitis – 2021

ACB Most Spectacular Player
Tornike Shengelia – 2019

Matches against NBA teams

Baskonia B 

Baskonia B is the reserve team of Baskonia. It currently plays in Liga EBA, the fourth tier of Spanish basketball.

References and notes

External links 

 
 Saski Baskonia at ACB.com 
 Saski Baskonia at EuroLeague.net

 
Basketball teams established in 1959
Basque basketball teams
Defunct and inactive League of Legends teams
EuroLeague clubs
Liga ACB teams